The S2 8.0 C is an American trailerable sailboat that was designed by Arthur Edmunds as a cruiser and first built in 1975. The number designation indicates the approximate length overall in meters and the "C" indicates "center cockpit".

The S2 8.0 A, S2 8.0 B and the 8.0 C all share the same hull design, with different deck configurations and interior arrangements used.

Production
The design was built by S2 Yachts in Holland, Michigan, United States, starting in 1975, with 210 boats completed, but it is now out of production.

Design
The S2 8.0 C is a recreational keelboat, built predominantly of fiberglass, with wood trim. It has a masthead sloop rig, a raked stem, a slightly angled transom, an internally mounted spade-type rudder controlled by a wheel and a fixed fin keel or shoal draft keel. It has a center cockpit, displaces  and carries  of ballast.

The boat is fitted with an inboard engine for docking and maneuvering.

The design has sleeping accommodation for four people, with a dinette table and benches in the bow that converts into a double "V"-berth and an aft cabin with a double berth. The galley is located on the port side just forward of the companionway ladder. The galley is equipped with a two-burner stove, an ice box and a sink. A navigation station is opposite the galley, under the cockpit. The head is located on the starboard side amidships.

For sailing the design may be equipped with a number of jibs or genoas.

See also
List of sailing boat types

References

Keelboats
1970s sailboat type designs
Sailing yachts
Trailer sailers
Sailboat type designs by Arthur Edmunds
Sailboat types built by S2 Yachts